Akatyev (masculine) or Akatyeva (feminine) is a Russian last name, a variant of Akatov.

People with the last name
Aleksey Akatyev (b. 1974), Russian Olympic freestyle swimmer

Toponyms
Akatyeva, alternative name of Akatyevo, a village under the administrative jurisdiction of the Town of Klin in Klinsky District of Moscow Oblast; 
Akatyeva, alternative name of Akatyevo, a selo in Nizhneneninsky Selsoviet of Soltonsky District in Altai Krai; 
Akatyeva, alternative name of Akatyevo, a selo in Akatyevskoye Rural Settlement of Kolomensky District in Moscow Oblast;

See also
Akatyevo, several rural localities in Russia

References

Notes

Sources
Ю. А. Федосюк (Yu. A. Fedosyuk). "Русские фамилии: популярный этимологический словарь" (Russian Last Names: a Popular Etymological Dictionary). Москва, 2006. 



Russian-language surnames